Benjamin William Lattimore (born September 7, 1939), known professionally as Latimore, is an American blues and R&B singer, songwriter and pianist. In 2017, Latimore was inducted in to the Blues Hall of Fame.

Life and career
Latimore was born in Charleston, Tennessee, and was influenced by country music, his Baptist church choir, and the blues. His first professional experience came as a pianist for various Florida-based groups including Steve Alaimo. He first recorded around 1965 for Henry Stone's Dade record label in Miami, Florida. In the early 1970s, he moved to the Glades label, and had his first major hit in 1973 with a jazzy reworking of T-Bone Walker's "Stormy Monday", which reached No. 27 on the R&B chart.

Latimore's first national hit was "If You Were My Woman," a gender-modified cover of "If I Were Your Woman" (written by Pam Sawyer, Clay McMurray and Gloria Jones and first popularized by Gladys Knight & the Pips), which reached No. 70 on the R&B chart. His biggest success came in 1974, with "Let's Straighten It Out", a No. 1 R&B hit, which also reached No. 31 on the US Billboard Hot 100 chart. He followed it up with more hits, including "Keep The Home Fire Burnin'" (No. 5 R&B, 1975) and "Somethin' 'Bout 'Cha" (No. 7 R&B, 1976).  The hits dissipated in the late 1970s.

Latimore moved to Malaco Records in 1982, releasing seven albums of modern blues music with that label. He briefly left the label in 1994 and released a song for the J-Town label, Turning Up The Mood, before returning to Malaco in 2000 with You're Welcome To Ride.  Next, Latimore recorded an album with Mel Waiters' label, Brittney Records, called Latt Is Back.

Later, Latimore collaborated with Henry Stone on a new record label called LatStone; which released his first new album in six years, Back 'Atcha.

He has continued to work as a session pianist. He appeared most recently on Joss Stone's albums, The Soul Sessions (2003) and Mind Body & Soul (2004), along with fellow Miami music veterans Betty Wright, Timmy Thomas and Willie Hale, and made an appearance in May 2014 on The Tonight Show Starring Jimmy Fallon.

In 2017, Latimore was inducted in to the Blues Hall of Fame.

Discography

Albums
1973 Latimore
1974 More, More, More Latimore, (Let's Straighten It Out) - Black Albums No. 13
1975 Latimore III - Black Albums No. 49
1976 It Ain't Where You Been...It's Where You're Goin''' - Pop Albums No. 181, Black Albums No. 47
1978 Dig a Little Deeper - Black Albums No. 51
1980 Getting Down to Brass Tacks1982 Singing in the Key of Love - Black Albums No. 61
1983 I'll Do Anything for You - Black Albums No. 66, Top R&B/Hip-Hop Albums No. 67
1985 Good Time Man1986 Every Way But Wrong1987 Slow Down1991 The Only Way Is Up - Top R&B/Hip-Hop Albums No. 34
1993 Catchin' Up1995 Best of Latimore: Sweet Vibrations1995 Straighten It Out: The Best of Latimore1996 Turnin' Up the Mood1998 All You'll Ever Need2000 You're Welcome to Ride2003 Latt Is Back2004 Sweet Vibrations: The Best of Latimore2005 The Early Years2007 Back 'Atcha2009 All About the Rhythm and the Blues2010 Live in Vienna2011 Ladies Choice2012 Henry Stones's Best Of: Latimore2013 Latimore Remembers Ray Charles''

Charted singles
1974: "If You Were My Woman" - Black Singles No. 70
1974: "Let's Straighten It Out" - Black Singles No. 1, Pop Singles No. 31
1975: "Keep the Home Fire Burnin'" - Black Singles No. 5
1975: "There's a Red-Neck in the Soul Band" - Black Singles No. 36
1976: "Qualified Man" - Black Singles No. 43
1977: "I Get Lifted" - Black Singles No. 30
1977: "Let Me Live the Life I Love" - Black Singles No. 49
1977: "Somethin' 'Bout 'Cha" - Black Singles No. 7, Pop Singles No. 37
1979: "Dig a Little Deeper" - Black Singles No. 42
1979: "Goodbye Heartache" - Black Singles No. 82
1979: "Long Distance Love" - Black Singles No. 75
1980: "Discoed to Death" - Black Singles No. 68
1986: "Sunshine Lady" - Hot R&B/Hip-Hop Singles & Tracks No. 76

References

External links
The complete Latimore Story at Soul Express
Latimore's full album discography at Soul Express

1939 births
Living people
People from Bradley County, Tennessee
Malaco Records artists
20th-century African-American male singers
21st-century African-American male singers